Grand Prix of France may mean:

 French Grand Prix (cars)
 French motorcycle Grand Prix
 Trophée Eric Bompard

See also
 French Grand Prix (disambiguation)
 Grand Prix (disambiguation)